Cerithiopsis atalaya is a species of sea snail, a gastropod in the family Cerithiopsidae, which is known from European oceans. It was described by Watson in 1885.

References

External links
 Watson, R. B. (1885). On the Cerithiopsides from the Eastern side of the North Atlantic with three new species from Madeira. Journal of the Linnean Society of London. Zoology. 19 (109): 89-95
  Gofas, S.; Le Renard, J.; Bouchet, P. (2001). Mollusca. in: Costello, M.J. et al. (eds), European Register of Marine Species: a check-list of the marine species in Europe and a bibliography of guides to their identification. Patrimoines Naturels. 50: 180-213
 Bouchet P. & Warén A. (1993). Revision of the Northeast Atlantic bathyal and abyssal Mesogastropoda. Bollettino Malacologico supplemento 3: 579-840

atalaya
Gastropods described in 1885